Cooters may refer to:

 The Cooters, a punk rock band from Mississippi.
 Pseudemys, a genus of turtle often called 'cooters'.

See also 
 Cooter (disambiguation)